The COVID-19 pandemic in the Republic of Ireland is part of the worldwide pandemic of coronavirus disease 2019 (COVID-19) caused by severe acute respiratory syndrome coronavirus 2 (SARS-CoV-2). In the Republic of Ireland, it has resulted in 1,705,295 cases and 8,719 deaths.

89.4% of those who died were aged over 65 and 76% had underlying illnesses with a median age of death at 82 years old. During 2020 and 2021, the country had one of the world's lowest excess death rates, which is an overall indicator of the pandemic's impact, at an estimated 12.5 deaths per 100,000 population.

The virus reached the country in late February 2020 and cases soon confirmed in all counties. The government first introduced public health and economic measures to mitigate its impact by shutting schools, childcare facilities and cultural institutions in March 2020. Large gatherings were cancelled, including St Patrick's Day festivities. On 27 March, the first stay-at-home order banned all non-essential travel and contact with others. People were made to keep apart in public, and those most at risk were told to cocoon. The Oireachtas passed an emergency act giving the state far-reaching powers to control the virus's spread, and the Gardaí given powers to enforce the lockdown.

The state's first lockdown in 2020 was the longest in Europe, especially for hospitality and retail. It caused a severe recession and an unprecedented rise in unemployment. Infections and deaths dropped to low levels by June and restrictions were gradually lifted, while schools remained closed for summer break. Pubs that served food were allowed to reopen in late June. However, "wet" pubs, or pubs that don't serve food, could not reopen until September. Ireland had the longest closure of pubs compared to other countries in Europe.

In October 2020, another statewide lockdown was imposed following a surge in cases, excluding schools.

In early December 2020, Ireland's infection rate was the lowest in the EU, and restrictions were eased. There was another surge in late December, and on Christmas Eve, another statewide lockdown was imposed. This was soon tightened to include schools, and was one of the strictest in the world. The vaccination programme began on 29 December, and has been praised as one of the most successful rollouts in the world.

In February 2021, the government imposed testing and quarantine rules on incoming travellers for the first time. Infections fell sharply, and schools re-opened in March. The lockdown was gradually lifted from May, but unlike most of Europe, indoor hospitality remained shut. Infections rose again in July due to the Delta variant but there were fewer deaths. Indoor hospitality reopened under strict rules, while vaccinations sped up. Despite Ireland's high vaccination rate, there was another surge in late 2021 due to the Omicron variant, with record-breaking cases being reported. Proof of vaccination or non-infection became mandatory to enter most indoor venues, but the government imposed another curfew on indoor hospitality from 20 December. Cases fell sharply, and the majority of restrictions, including mandatory mask wearing and social distancing, were eased in January and February 2022.

As well as the major strain on Ireland's healthcare service, the pandemic measures severely damaged Ireland's economy, disrupted education and had far-reaching impacts on society, including politics, religion, crime, the arts and sports.

Statistics
The surveillance of COVID-19 cases was integrated into existing national Computerised Infectious Disease Reporting (CIDR) system since COVID-19 was made a notifiable disease on 20 February 2020. CIDR is the information system used to manage the surveillance and control of infectious diseases in Ireland, both at regional and national level. Daily epidemiological reports on COVID-19 were prepared by the Health Protection Surveillance Centre (HPSC) for the National Public Health Emergency Team (NPHET). Additional information was provided by the Health Service Executive (HSE) in its daily operations updates.

In February 2022 the Health Protection Surveillance Centre (HPSC) launched their Epidemiology of COVID-19 in Ireland Data Hub.  The Data Hub provided the latest data relating to cases, deaths and outbreaks in Ireland.

By 14 March 2023, the Department of Health had confirmed 1,705,295 cases and 8,719 deaths; a rate of 339,529 cases per million, 1,735 deaths per million and 2,597,898 tests per million population.

Timeline

First Wave
The National Public Health Emergency Team (NPHET), a group within the Department of Health, began monitoring the spread of the virus before it was confirmed to have reached Ireland. The Coronavirus Expert Advisory Group—a subgroup of NPHET chaired by Dr Cillian de Gascun, the UCD-based Director of the National Virus Reference Laboratory – met for the first time on 5 February in Dublin.

On 27 February, the first case on the island of Ireland was announced—a woman from Belfast who had travelled from Northern Italy through Dublin Airport. Two days later, on 29 February, the first confirmed case in the Republic of Ireland was announced involving a male student from the east of the country, who had arrived there from Northern Italy. Authorities shut a secondary school linked to the case as a precautionary measure.

On 11 March, an elderly patient in Naas General Hospital in County Kildare (south-west of the country's capital city, Dublin) became Ireland's first fatality from the virus.

On 12 March, Taoiseach Leo Varadkar announced the closure of all schools, colleges and childcare facilities until 29 March. The announcement came one day after the World Health Organization formally declared the outbreak a pandemic.

On 15 March, the Government ordered bars and public houses to close and advised against house parties.

On 27 March, Taoiseach Leo Varadkar announced a national stay-at-home order with a series of measures which he summed up as: "Stay at Home". The measures, which coincided with an escalating death toll, were also a response to increased reliance on intensive care units (ICUs) to treat critically ill patients, and an attempt to lower this number before capacity was reached.

On 15 April, a 23-year-old became Ireland's youngest person to die with the virus at the time.

On 16 April, the National Public Health Emergency Team reported that lockdown and other measures had driven the growth rate of the pandemic "as low as it needs to be" and was "close to zero".

On 1 May, Taoiseach Leo Varadkar announced the extension of the current restrictions to 18 May at the earliest. A roadmap to easing restrictions in Ireland that included five stages was adopted by the government and subsequently published online. COVID-19 restrictions began to be eased from Monday 18 May.

On 7 July, the Health Service Executive (HSE) released the COVID Tracker contact tracing app that uses ENS and Bluetooth technology to record if a user is in close contact with another user, by exchanging anonymous codes, with over one million downloads within two days after its launch.

Second Wave
On 7 August, Taoiseach Micheál Martin announced a series of measures for counties Kildare, Laois and Offaly following significant increases of COVID-19 cases in the three counties.

On 15 September, the Government announced a medium-term plan for living with COVID-19 that included five levels of restrictions.

Resilience and recovery 2020-2021: Plan for living with COVID-19, announced on 15 September 2020.

On 4 October, following an increase in cases, the National Public Health Emergency Team recommended the highest level of restrictions for the entire country – Level 5 for four weeks. The Government rejected NPHET's recommendation, and instead moved every county in Ireland to Level 3 COVID-19 restrictions with improved enforcement and indoor dining in pubs and restaurants banned.

After 1,205 cases—the highest number of confirmed cases recorded in a single day since 10 April—was confirmed by the Department of Health on 15 October, on 16 October, NPHET recommended the Government to move the entire country to Level 5 restrictions for six weeks.

On 19 October, the Government agreed to move the entire country to Level 5 lockdown restrictions.

COVID-19 restrictions began to be eased from 1 December, with the reopening of all non-essential retail shops, hair and beauty providers, gyms and leisure centres, cinemas, museums and galleries, while thousands of restaurants, cafés, gastropubs and hotel restaurants reopened three days later.

Third Wave
On 21 December, the Chair of the NPHET Irish Epidemiological Modelling Advisory Group Philip Nolan announced that a third wave of COVID-19 in Ireland was clearly underway.

On 22 December, the Government agreed to move the entire country to Level 5 lockdown restrictions with a number of adjustments from Christmas Eve until 12 January 2021 at the earliest.

On Christmas Day, Chief Medical Officer Tony Holohan confirmed that the new Alpha variant of COVID-19 had been detected in the Republic of Ireland by whole genome sequencing at the National Virus Reference Laboratory in University College Dublin. By week 2 of 2021, the variant had become the dominant strain in Ireland.

On 30 December, the Government agreed to move the entire country to full Level 5 lockdown restrictions from midnight until 31 January 2021 at the earliest.

On 31 December, a further 1,620 cases and 12 deaths were reported, bringing the end of 2020 totals to 91,779 cases and 2,237 deaths.

On 2 January 2021, it was revealed that there were approximately 9,000 positive COVID-19 tests not yet logged on the HSE's IT systems, due to both limitations in the software; and lack of staff to check and input details, meaning there is an effective ceiling of approximately 1,700 to 2,000 cases that can be logged each day.

On 6 January, COVID-19 restrictions were re-imposed statewide, which included the closure of schools.

On 8 January, the Beta variant of COVID-19 arrived in Ireland.

On 30 January, Chief Medical Officer Tony Holohan announced that more cases had been confirmed in one month than throughout 2020 with over 1,000 deaths and more than 100,000 cases confirmed in January.

On 31 January, a further 1,247 cases and 15 deaths were reported, bringing the totals to 196,547 cases and 3,307 deaths.

On 10 February, the World Health Organization praised Ireland's recovery from the third wave of COVID-19 but warned of the danger of a fourth wave.

On 23 February, the Government published its new revised Living with COVID-19 plan, which included the phased reopening of schools and childcare and the extension of the COVID-19 Pandemic Unemployment Payment and the Employment Wage Subsidy Scheme.

On 28 February, Ireland officially marked one year since the first case of COVID-19 in the country was confirmed on 29 February 2020. A further 612 cases and 6 deaths were reported, bringing the end of February totals to 219,592 cases and 4,319 deaths.

COVID-19 restrictions began to be eased throughout the summer, despite the arrival of the Delta variant in June. By 24 June, 210 cases of the Delta variant had been detected in Ireland.

Fourth Wave

On 29 June, due to the rapidly increasing incidence of the Delta variant, the Government announced that the planned reopening of indoor dining and drinking in restaurants and pubs on 5 July would be delayed until at least 19 July when a system to verify vaccination or immunity would be implemented, while 50 guests would be permitted to attend wedding celebrations as an exception from July.

Cases increased again in July, which was caused by the Delta variant.

People who were awaiting full vaccination were urged to "take every precaution", with the highest cases among the 16–34 age cohorts, a significant shift from previous waves. On 17 July, a further 1,377 cases were reported, the highest recorded in six months.

Despite the increasing cases, the Government agreed that indoor dining in pubs and restaurants could resume on Monday 26 July for fully vaccinated and COVID-19 recovered people, after President Michael D. Higgins signed the legislation underpinning new guidelines into law.

On 14 September, Chief Medical Officer Tony Holohan warned that new COVID-19 restrictions could not be ruled out and "may be required in the future", despite very high levels of COVID-19 vaccine uptake.

Daily cases began to surge again in October. A further 2,002 cases were reported on 8 October.

Remaining COVID-19 restrictions, including the reopening of nightclubs and requirements on social distancing, mask wearing and vaccination certificates, were due to be eased on 22 October.

On 19 October, the Government announced that nightclubs were allowed to reopen on 22 October, but vaccination certificates, social distancing and mask wearing measures would remain in place. A further 2,399 cases were reported, the highest daily number since 22 January. On the day nightclubs reopened, a further 2,466 cases were reported, the highest daily number since 21 January.

On 11 November, a 14-year-old teenager became Ireland's youngest person to die with COVID-19. 5,483 cases were reported the next day. A further 5,959 cases were reported on 20 November.

On 27 November, the NPHET Epidemiological Modelling Advisory Group began meeting to monitor the Omicron variant situation in Europe, and began considering further required measures.

On 30 November, a further 5,471 cases were reported, bringing the totals to 570,115 cases and 5,652 deaths.

On 1 December, the Omicron variant arrived in Ireland. On 3 December, COVID-19 restrictions were re-imposed amid concerns of the Omicron variant, with nightclubs to close, bars and restaurants to revert to six adults per table and no multiple table bookings allowed, indoor cultural and sporting events to operate at 50% capacity, a maximum of four households allowed to meet indoors and the requirement of vaccination certificates extended to gyms, leisure centres and hotel bars.

On 9 December, health officials announced that five further cases of the Omicron variant had been detected, bringing to six the total number of cases that had been identified in Ireland following whole genome sequencing. On 12 December, four additional cases of the variant were detected, bringing to 10 the total number of cases that had been identified. Cases of the Omicron variant continued to increase rapidly.

Fifth Wave
On 15 December, Chief Medical Officer Tony Holohan urged people to take precautions to avoid being in isolation for Christmas.

A fifth wave of COVID-19 had arrived in Ireland on 19 December, according to the Health Protection Surveillance Centre.

Further COVID-19 restrictions were imposed on 20 December for the Christmas period, with an 8pm closing time for bars, restaurants, live events, cinemas and theatres. A further 7,333 cases were reported the next day, the highest number reported since early January. On 19 December, the Omicron variant became Ireland's dominant variant after it was confirmed that 52% of cases were now due to the variant.

On Christmas Day, a record 13,765 cases were reported, while a further 16,428 cases were reported on 29 December. Chief Medical Officer Tony Holohan expressed concern and stated that "every individual should consider themselves potentially infectious". A record 20,554 cases were reported the next day, as it was confirmed that 92% of cases were now due to the Omicron variant. Holohan urged people to keep social contacts low and not to hold household gatherings on New Year's Eve, while Minister for Health Stephen Donnelly announced new advice on COVID-19 testing and the period of isolation.

On 31 December, a further 20,110 cases were reported, bringing the end of 2021 totals to 788,559 cases and 5,912 deaths. On New Year's Day, 23,281 cases were recorded, as health officials warned that the true number of cases was likely to be higher, due to increased pressure on the PCR testing system. On 8 January, a record 26,122 cases were reported – the highest daily number reported since the pandemic began. By 10 January, 1,000,000 total cases had been confirmed, with more cases recorded in the first five days of 2022 than in the whole of 2020.

Cases fell sharply after the 8 January peak, and on 21 January, Taoiseach Micheál Martin announced the easing of almost all COVID-19 restrictions, with the requirements of vaccine certificates and social distancing to end, restrictions on household visits and capacity limits for indoor and outdoor events to end, nightclubs to reopen and pubs and restaurants to resume normal trading times, while rules on isolation and the wearing of masks in certain settings would remain. Remaining restrictions were agreed to be removed from 28 February, with mask wearing in schools, indoor retail settings and on public transport to be voluntary, restrictions in schools to end and testing to be scaled back, while it was agreed that the National Public Health Emergency Team (NPHET) be disbanded.

By March 2022, cases and hospitalisations began to increase again, as Ireland entered a new wave of the Omicron variant.

Despite this, celebrations took place across the country to mark St Patrick's Day, following a two-year absence due to COVID-19, with around 400,000 people attending festivities in Dublin. Figures showed on 21 March that 63,954 people had tested positive for COVID-19 since St Patrick's Day. The World Health Organization said Ireland eased restrictions too "brutally" and was now seeing a spike in cases as a result.

Dr Tony Holohan announced a few days later that he would step down as Chief Medical Officer on 1 July, after being appointed to a new role at Trinity College Dublin. This caused several days of controversy, and as a result, Holohan announced that he would retire as CMO on 1 July and would not take up his planned academic position at TCD.

On 27 March, hospitalisations reached its highest level in 14 months with 1,569 COVID-19 patients. Two days later, Minister for Health Stephen Donnelly said there were no plans for restrictions to be re-introduced, despite the number of COVID-19 cases likely to be "hundreds of thousands" per week, while he said the BA.2 variant now accounted for about 95% of cases in Ireland.

A new COVID-19 advisory group was established on 8 April 2022. By early April, case numbers began to decrease but remained high. On 16 April, hospital and ICU numbers continued to decrease to its lowest levels since 5 March.

The BA.4 sub-variant of Omicron was confirmed to have arrived in Ireland during the week of 7 May.

On 10 June, Minister for Health Stephen Donnelly urged people to take up their booster vaccine after COVID-19 hospitalisations began to rise, while Tánaiste Leo Varadkar warned of a potential summer wave of COVID-19.

By 20 June, there were 606 patients in hospital with COVID-19, an increase of 153 from the previous week. HSE Chief Clinical Officer Dr Colm Henry said he was "very concerned", while a virologist at UCD said it was too late to reintroduce mandatory mask wearing, adding that the latest wave of infection had been "completely predictable".

As of July 2022, there had been 1,628,745 infections and 7,571 coronavirus-related deaths reported in the country since the pandemic began.

Vaccines

COVID-19 vaccination in the Republic of Ireland began on 29 December 2020. Annie Lynch, a 79-year-old woman, became the first person in the Republic of Ireland to receive the Pfizer–BioNTech COVID-19 vaccine at St. James's Hospital, Dublin, and received the second dose three weeks later on Tuesday 19 January 2021.

Maura Byrne, a 95-year-old woman, became the first nursing home resident in the Republic of Ireland to receive the Pfizer COVID-19 vaccine on 5 January 2021, while Dr Eavan Muldoon, an infectious diseases consultant, became the first healthcare worker in the Mater University Hospital to receive the vaccine.

By the end of January, three effective vaccines of Pfizer–BioNTech, Moderna and Oxford–AstraZeneca were in use in Ireland.

By 10 September, 90% of adults in Ireland were fully vaccinated against COVID-19.

Ireland's vaccination rollout has been praised as one of the most successful rollouts in the world and was ranked number one in the European Union in terms of its percentage of adult population fully vaccinated, and was also ranked number one in the EU for the number of booster vaccines administered.

A booster programme began in late September 2021 and a second and third booster programme began throughout 2022.

Testing

The developing and delivering of testing of Ireland was led by the staff in the National Virus Reference Laboratory. With the acquisition of the sequence of the virus, they used this to develop and validate in-house assays in advance of obtaining any commercial diagnostic kits. The NVRL played a vital role in the early detection of COVID-19 cases in Ireland, and began playing a vital role in the detection of new variants of COVID-19 in 2021.

Cases

Impacts

Economy

Like most countries in the world, the pandemic's emergence and the lockdowns it led to deeply impacted the Irish economy, causing it to plunge into a recession. While there were job losses in all sectors primarily due to stay-at-home orders, individuals working in tourism, hospitality, food and retail were most likely to be affected.

A COVID-19 Pandemic Unemployment Payment and a Temporary COVID-19 Wage Subsidy Scheme were set up.

Society

The social impact of the pandemic had far-reaching consequences in the country that went beyond the spread of the disease itself and efforts to quarantine it, including political, criminal, religious, educational, artistic and sporting implications.

The 2020 Leaving Certificate, 2020–2021 Junior Certificate and all 2020–2021 Irish language summer courses in the Gaeltacht were cancelled. The 2020 Dublin Horse Show was cancelled, the first time since 1940 that the event did not occur. The Tidy Towns competition was cancelled for the first time in its 62-year history. The Rose of Tralee was cancelled for the first time in its 61-year history. The 2020 National Ploughing Championships and Ballinasloe Horse Fair also did not take place. The All-Ireland Senior Football Championship and All-Ireland Senior Hurling Championship were completed in December in between the second and third waves of the virus to hit Ireland, maintaining their record of having been held annually since 1887.

Gallery

See also
 2020 in Ireland
 2021 in Ireland
 2022 in Ireland
 COVID-19 pandemic in Northern Ireland
 Michael Ryan, Irish epidemiologist and executive director of the World Health Organization's Health Emergencies Programme

Notes

References

Further reading

 McCarthy, Justin (22 March 2020). "Retired GP joins battle against COVID-19: 'I want to come back and help people' " RTÉ News and Current Affairs.
 Fegan, Catherine (24 March 2020). " 'Stay indoors, I'm young, sporty and fit, I never would have thought I'd catch coronavirus' " Irish Independent.
 Leahy, Pat (28 March 2020). "Inside the Government's battle against coronavirus: Working under unparalleled pressure, Irish officials are facing the crisis with trepidation" The Irish Times.
 Power, Jack (4 April 2020). "Covid-19: Inside the operation to evacuate Irish stranded abroad – From Peru and Australia: Behind the scenes story of how diplomats got the Irish home" The Irish Times.
 Bray, Jennifer; Leahy, Pat (9 April 2020). "The inside story of how gardaí were granted their new powers: Taoiseach was reluctant to grant new powers, but Kehoe, Madigan and Flanagan were in favour" The Irish Times.
 McGrath, Dominic (16 April 2020). "Tracked: How the HSE advice to nursing homes shifted between March and April" TheJournal.ie.
 McGee, Harry (8 January 2021). "Covid-19: The inside story of how the contact tracing system averted a Christmas collapse" The Irish Times.
 McGreevy, Ronan (10 January 2022). "How Ireland reached 1 million confirmed cases of Covid-19" The Irish Times.

External links
 Ireland's COVID-19 Data Hub
 Epidemiology of COVID-19 in Ireland Data Hub
 COVID-19 updates from the Health Service Executive (HSE)

2020 in the Republic of Ireland 
2021 in the Republic of Ireland
2022 in the Republic of Ireland
2023 in the Republic of Ireland
 
Ireland
Ireland
-Republic
Disease outbreaks in the Republic of Ireland
2020 disasters in Ireland 
2021 disasters in Ireland 
2022 disasters in Ireland